State Route 178 (SR 178) is a state highway in the U.S. state of California that exists in two constructed segments.  The gap in between segments is connected by various local roads and State Route 190 through Death Valley National Park. The western segment runs from State Route 99 in Bakersfield and over the Walker Pass in the Sierra Nevada to the turnoff for the Trona Pinnacles National Natural Landmark. The eastern segment runs from the southeasterly part of Death Valley to Nevada State Route 372 at the Nevada state line.

SR 178 serves many different purposes. It connects Downtown Bakersfield with East Bakersfield and Lake Isabella. It is one of three crossings over the Sierra Nevada south of Yosemite (SR 120, Tioga Pass Road), connecting the southern San Joaquin Valley with the upper Mojave Desert and the Owens Valley. This also provides access to Death Valley National Park. If the unconstructed portion were built, it would also provide an easy route between Ridgecrest, California and Las Vegas, via Pahrump, Nevada.

Route description
SR 178 is part of the California Freeway and Expressway System, and through Bakersfield and Ridgecrest is part of the National Highway System, a network of highways that are considered essential to the country's economy, defense, and mobility by the Federal Highway Administration. It is eligible for the State Scenic Highway System, but it is not officially designated as a scenic highway by the California Department of Transportation.

Western segment

The first segment starts at State Route 99 just west of Downtown Bakersfield. The road continues as 24th Street but then splits at B Street, utilizing 24th Street for westbound traffic and 23rd Street for eastbound traffic through Downtown Bakersfield. SR 178 becomes a freeway as it leaves Downtown and winds through East Bakersfield. The freeway then travels east as it enters Northeast Bakersfield. A mile east of the Morning Drive interchange, the freeway segment ends with the first at-grade intersection at Canteria Drive. The highway continues through the rural, but growing Rio Bravo section of Bakersfield, crossing SR 184. Turning northeast, the road narrows to a 4-lane highway and continues to the mouth of Kern Canyon (which is also the northeastern city limits of Bakersfield). For the next approximately 8 miles, the route is a narrow 2-lane road (average width of 18 ft. to 24 ft.), as it ascends the lower Sierra Nevada. Average speed is 35 mph, with sharp turns and steep dropoffs. After approximately 8 miles, the road becomes a much gentler 4-lane, 60 ft. expressway. The route continues east and reaches the town of Lake Isabella, which is just south of the Lake Isabella Reservoir. The road briefly expands to a divided freeway through Lake Isabella, before narrowing to a 2-lane conventional highway at the intersection with Lake Isabella Boulevard. The highway then descends from the mountains to its junction with State Route 14. It then proceeds eastward across US 395 into the city of Ridgecrest. The constructed highway then ends east of Ridgecrest at the turnoff for the Trona Pinnacles National Natural Landmark. The right-of-way then continues north as the county-maintained routes of Trona Road, Trona-Wildrose Road, and then Panamint Valley Road, running through the community of Trona to SR 190 east of Panamint Springs.

Eastern segment

The second segment resumes four miles (6 km) west of Salisberry Pass in the southeasterly part of Death Valley National Park in Inyo County at what had been the former boundary of Death Valley National Monument until 1994.  It then meets up with State Route 127. SR 178 then branches northward from SR 127 to the California-Nevada State Line. In Nevada, the roadway continues as State Route 372 ending at State Route 160 near the center of Pahrump in Nye County.

The segment of State Route 178 from State Route 127 to the California-Nevada state line, as well as all of Nevada State Route 372, are both known as the Charles Brown Highway.  Charles Brown, a former California State Legislator, was a major proponent for the incorporation of the segment of State Route 178 between State Route 14 and the California-Nevada state line into the California Highway System.

History
SR 178 was one of the routes created with the third bond act of 1919. It defined a route 202 miles long between Santa Maria and Freeman Junction through Bakersfield. Freeman does not exist today; it was originally located near (and later at) the junction of SR 178 and SR 14. The route was defined as Legislative Route 57. The 1919 bond act also created the first segment of LRN 58. The route was extended several times since 1919. In 1933, the final segment was added to LRN 58, which created a route from US 101 near Santa Margarita to the Nevada state line via Bakersfield. Construction on the route between Bakersfield and Isabella through Kern Canyon started in 1922. Progress moved slowly, as sheer rock walls had to be blasted with dynamite. In 1931, 9 years after construction started, the 26-mile highway segment was completed.

In 1933, with the creation of signed routes, portions of LRN 57 and LRN 58 would be signed as Route 178. LRN 58 would be signed between Route 33 and US 99, and LRN 57 would be signed between US 99 and US 6. Later, in 1947, LRN 212 was created, and defined to run from LRN 23 (signed as US 6) near Inyokern, east to the Nevada state line. It was an unsigned route.

From 1950 to 1953, a portion of SR 178 in Lake Isabella was rerouted around the Isabella Auxiliary Dam. The dam was built over the old route and parts of it are inundated by Isabella Lake. The new route goes over the dam's southern abutment and along the shoreline of Isabella Lake toward Onyx.

In 1964, all of the California routes were renumbered. LRN 58 was dropped from Route 178 and combined with the eastern portion of the decommissioned US 466 (also defined as part of LRN 58) to create SR 58. The remaining Route 178 was combined with LRN 212 to create SR 178. It was originally defined to start at SR 99 in Bakersfield, but later that year it was changed to simply start in Bakersfield. This change was probably done to avoid a cosign with SR 58 along 23rd/24th St. After SR 58 was moved to the freeway south of Brundage Lane in 1976, SR 178 was extended west to SR 99.

Construction on the initial freeway in Bakersfield was completed in 1968. It ran from M St, on the eastern edge of Downtown, through East Bakersfield to Haley Street. Eastern extensions have been constructed since 1968, one interchange at a time as the need arises. In the Kern Canyon section, which is between Bakersfield and the Kern River Valley, a bypass route was identified in 1964. By 1968, a deed from the US Forest Service issued an easement to the State for the construction of the highway through National Forest lands. The first phase of construction was completed in 1974, which created a short freeway near Lake Isabella and a 60’ wide expressway extending west to China Garden. Subsequent phases were not funded.

Abandoned western freeway extension
The freeway portion of Route 178, completed in the late 1950s, ends as it approaches downtown Bakersfield from the east. Weak public support and subsequent lack of funds hindered efforts to complete the freeway through downtown and Westchester to its proposed terminus at the beginning of the modern-day Westside Parkway. Although freeway alternatives through various neighborhoods have been studied several times following the existing portion's completion in 1968, the city of Bakersfield never formally endorsed a route. Caltrans formally announced preference for an alignment through downtown and Westchester in 1973, but fierce public opposition coupled with the historic integrity of the neighborhoods slated to be demolished greatly hindered momentum of the project. In 1977, then-Governor Jerry Brown issued a moratorium on all new freeway construction. Formal studies on possible routes continued and resulted in recommendations of a more southern alignment near Truxtun Avenue executed by the Kern Council of Governors (KernCOG) in 1986 and the 2001 Bakersfield System Study.

A Westchester alignment would have extended the freeway west from its current terminus at M Street and through Downtown Bakersfield in the vicinity of 23rd street. As it continued through Westchester the freeway would turn southwest, cross under SR 99 and terminate at the newly completed Westside Parkway.

A southern alignment would start at SR 178 at Baker Street, about 0.7 miles east of its current terminus. From there, it would turn southwest and run parallel to Baker Street, through East Bakersfield, to the BNSF railroad yard. It would then turn west and run south of the railroad tracks through the southern end of Downtown Bakersfield. At Bakersfield High School, it would run north of the tracks (avoiding the high school). It would continue under SR 99 and terminate at the proposed Westside Parkway.

City of Bakersfield 24th Street Improvements
Still needing to address the increasing crosstown congestion and with a freeway through downtown effectively out of the question, the City of Bakersfield approved construction in the late 2000s to increase capacity on 24th Street through Westchester and 23rd and 24th streets through Downtown using TRIP funds. The project widened, realigned and re-striped 24th Street from west of State Route 99 to east of M Street, as well as realigned and re-striped 23rd Street from west of C Street to east of M Street, in order to add two travel lanes (one in each direction) to the roadway. The project also encompassed improvements to the 24th Street/State Route 99 interchange and widened the Oak Street/24th Street intersection. This solution required the acquisition of several properties north of 24th Street, which was completed in early 2015, as well as the closure of access of B Street through Elm Street from the north. The project was completed in December 2020.

Future

Death Valley Segment
This segment is unconstructed from 15 miles east of Ridgecrest to 15 miles west of SR 127 (10 miles from the eastern boundary of the Death Valley National Park at what had been its former boundary prior to 1994). The state is considering three options: select an alignment to connect with the current eastern segment at its present location; select an alignment to avoid traversing the Death Valley Wilderness; or delete this unconstructed segment from the State Highway System.

The County of Inyo has offered three alternatives:
 The State of California rescinds the unconstructed portion of SR 178.
 The State of California rescinds the unconstructed portion of SR 178 and adopts Trona Road, Trona-Wildrose Road, and Panamint Valley Road.
 The State of California rescinds the unconstructed portion of SR 178 and adopts Trona Road, Trona-Wildrose Road, and Panamint Valley Road; Inyo County adopts portions of SR 178 and SR 190, and Death Valley National Park adopts the portion of SR 178 that connects to Badwater Road in the park.

Major intersections

See also

References

External links

Caltrans: Route 178 highway conditions
AARoads: State Route 178
California Highways: State Route 178

178
178
State Route 178
State Route 178
State Route 178
State Route 178
Amargosa Desert
Death Valley
Death Valley National Park
Kern River
Kern River Valley
Mojave Desert
Ridgecrest, California
San Joaquin Valley
Searles Valley
Sequoia National Forest